Leonard Seabrooke (born 1974) is an Australian academic, and a professor in International Political Economy and Economic sociology at the Copenhagen Business School.  Seabrooke's research primarily concerns the role of professionals and experts in treating social and economic problems, the politics of access to credit, tax, and property within economies, and the role of 'Global Wealth Chains' in the international political economy. He has also worked on the social sources of how states generate international financial capacity, how 'everyday politics' has an influence on the world economy, how international organizations create policy scripts, and the connection between welfare systems, housing, fertility, and international finance. Seabrooke has published articles in highly ranked international peer review journals in the fields of International Political Economy and Economic and Organizational Sociology, including Annual Review of Sociology, American Sociological Review, Governance, International Studies Quarterly, Journal of European Public Policy, Organization, Public Administration, Review of International Political Economy, and many others. Seabrooke was also the Director of Studies of the Warwick Commission on International Financial Reform, which brought together economists, political scientists, and lawyers from both the scholarly and policy worlds to discuss financial reform and re-regulation.

Seabrooke has led a number of research projects funded by the European Commission, think tanks, and foundations. These include the 'Professions in International Political Economies' project (2011-2014) funded by the European Research Council and the 'European Legitimacy in Governing through Hard Times' project (2015-2018) from the European Commission Horizon 2020 programme. He is also co-leading, with Eleni Tsingou, a project on 'Expert Niches' funded by the VELUX Foundation. Seabrooke is also leading a finance work package in the ADD - Algoritmer, Data og Demokrati project led by Sine Nørholm Just, as well as the Expert Networks package in the Time Mirror project on green accounting led by Thomas Riise Johansen and funded by the Independent Research Fund Denmark.

Music
Seabrooke played bass guitar and sang in the bluegaze bass and drum duo Me After You with Federico Festino. Their album, Foughts, was produced by Andy Miller, and released with Custom Made Music in 2013. Seabrooke plays drums, bass, and bouzouki in Boogles and Junk Boat, as well as with South African musician Jim Neversink, and Norwegian singer Håkon Lervåg.

References

Living people
1974 births
Australian sociologists
Danish sociologists
Academic staff of Copenhagen Business School
People from South Australia